Ipswich Town Football Club are an English professional association football club based in Ipswich, Suffolk.  The club was founded in 1878 and turned professional in 1936.  Ipswich have played at all professional levels of English football and have participated in European football since the 1960s.  The team currently plays in the third tier of English football.

This list encompasses the major honours won by Ipswich Town, records set by the club, their managers and their players, and details the club's European performances. The player records section includes details of the club's leading goalscorers and those who have made most appearances in first-team competitions. It also records notable achievements by Ipswich players on the international stage, and the highest transfer fees paid and received by the club.   Attendance records at Portman Road, the club's home ground since 1884, are also included in the list.

Honours 
Ipswich Town have won honours both domestically and in European Cup competitions. The club has won the English League Championship (1961–62) and the FA Cup (1978) and, in European competition, won the UEFA Cup in 1980–81. Their last senior league honour was the Football League Second Division title in 1992.

Domestic

League titles
Football League First Division / Premier League
Winners (1): 1961–62
Runners-up (2): 1980–81, 1981–82
Football League Second Division / Football League Championship
Winners (3): 1960–61, 1967–68, 1991–92
Play-off winners (1): 1999–2000
Football League Third Division / Football League One
Winners (2): 1953–54, 1956–57
Southern League
Winners (1): 1938–39

Cups
FA Cup
Winners (1): 1977–78
Texaco Cup
Winners (1): 1972–73

European 
UEFA Cup / UEFA Europa League
Winners (1): 1980–81

Friendly 
Amsterdam Tournament
Winners (1): 1981
Uhren Cup
Winners (1): 1963
Willhire Cup
Winners (2): 1978, 1979
Ipswich Charity Cup
Winners (4): 1896–97, 1897–98, 1898–99, 1899–1900
Ipswich Hospital Cup
Winners (7): 1929, 1930, 1932, 1936, 1959, 1988, 1990
Paisley Charity Cup
Winners (1): 1966 (shared)

Other 
South East Anglian League
Champions (1): 1903–04
Runners-up (1): 1904–05
Southern Amateur League
Champions (4): 1921–22, 1929–30, 1932–33, 1933–34
Runners-up (2): 1922–23, 1930–31
Suffolk Challenge Cup
Winners (3): 1886–87, 1888–89, 1889–90
Suffolk Senior Cup
Winners (16): 1886–87, 1888–89, 1889–90, 1895–96, 1899–1900, 1903–04, 1904–05, 1905–06, 1906–07, 1907–08, 1911–12, 1912–13, 1913–14, 1927–28, 1928–29, 1929–30

Player records

Appearances 
Youngest first-team player: Connor Wickham, 16 years 11 days (against Doncaster Rovers, 11 April 2009).
Oldest first-team player: Mick Burns, 43 years 219 days (against Gateshead, 12 January 1952).

Most appearances
Competitive, professional matches only, appearances as substitutes in brackets.

Goalscorers 
Most goals in a season: Ted Phillips, 46 goals (including 41 league goals) in the 1956–57 season.
Most league goals in a season: Ted Phillips, 41 goals in the 1956–57 season.
Youngest goalscorer: Jason Dozzell, 16 years 57 days (against Coventry City, 4 February 1984).

Top goalscorers
Ray Crawford is the all-time top goalscorer for Ipswich Town.  In the 1970–71 season, he became the first footballer to score hat-tricks in the Football League, League Cup, FA Cup and European Cup. 
Competitive, professional matches only, appearances including substitutes appear in brackets.

International caps 

Ipswich Town turned professional in 1936, and the first player to be capped by a national side received his call-up as recently as 1952. Many of the records in this section were established during the late 1970s and early 1980s, when Ipswich achieved success unparalleled in the club's history. This section refers only to caps won while an Ipswich Town player.
First capped player: Billy Reed for Wales against Yugoslavia on 22 September 1954.
First capped player for England: Ray Crawford against Northern Ireland on 22 November 1961.
Most capped player: Allan Hunter with 47 caps for Northern Ireland as an Ipswich player.
Most capped player for England: Terry Butcher, 45 caps while an Ipswich player.
First player to play in the World Cup Finals: Alan Brazil and John Wark for Scotland against New Zealand in Málaga on 15 June 1982.
First player to score in a World Cup Finals: John Wark for Scotland against New Zealand in Málaga on 15 June 1982.
First player to play for England in the World Cup Finals: Terry Butcher, Mick Mills and Paul Mariner against France in Bilbao on 16 June 1982.
First player to score in the World Cup Finals for England: Paul Mariner against France in Bilbao on 16 June 1982.
Most World Cup Finals appearances: Terry Butcher, 9 (1982 and 1986).
Most World Cup Finals goals: John Wark, 2 (1982).
First player to play in the European Championships Finals: Frans Thijssen for Holland against Germany on 14 June 1980.
Most European Championships appearances: Claus Thomsen, 3 (1996).

Transfers

Firsts
Sergei Baltacha became the first Soviet footballer to play in Britain when he joined Ipswich Town from Dynamo Kiev in 1988.
Adrián Paz became the first Uruguayan to play in the Premier League after joining Ipswich in 1994.

Record transfer fees paid

Record transfer fees received

Managerial records 

First manager in the professional era: Mick O'Brien (managed the club for 39 games from May 1936 to August 1937).
Longest serving manager: Bobby Robson (managed the club for 709 games from January 1969 to August 1982).

Club records

Goals 
Most league goals scored in a season: 106 in 46 matches, Third Division South, 1955–56.
Fewest league goals scored in a season: 32 in 42 matches, First Division, 1985–86.
Most league goals conceded in a season: 121 in 42 matches, First Division, 1963–64.
Fewest league goals conceded in a season: 32 in 46 matches, First Division, 1988–89.

Points 
Most points in a season:
Two points for a win: 64 (in 46 games in 1953–54, Division Three South and in 1955–56, Division Three South).
Three points for a win: 87 (in 46 games in 1999–2000, First Division).
Fewest points in a season:
Two points for a win: 25 (in 42 games in 1963–64, First Division).
Three points for a win: 27 (in 42 games in 1994–95 FA Premier League).

Matches

Firsts
First match: Ipswich Town 6–1 Stoke Wanderers, a friendly at Broom Hill, 2 November 1878.
First league match: Ipswich Town 4–1 Tunbridge Wells Rangers, Southern League at Portman Road, 29 August 1936.
First FA Cup match: Ipswich Town 2–0 Reading, first qualifying round, 4 October 1890.
First European match: Floriana 1–4 Ipswich Town, European Cup, preliminary round, 18 September 1962.
First League Cup match: Ipswich 0–2 Barnsley, first round, 11 October 1960.

Record wins
Record league win: 7–0, vs.
Portsmouth in the Second Division, 7 November 1964.
Southampton in the First Division, 2 February 1974.
West Bromwich Albion in the First Division, 6 November 1976.
Record away league win: 0–6, vs.
Notts County, in Division One, 25 September 1982.
Swindon Town, in Division One, 3 April 1999.
Doncaster Rovers, in the Championship, 15 February 2011.
Record FA Cup win: 
11–0 against Cromer, Division final, 31 October 1936.
Record European win: 
10–0 against Floriana, in the European Cup, preliminary round second leg, 25 September 1962.

Record defeats
Record league defeat:
10–1 against Fulham in the First Division, 26 December 1963.
9–0 against Manchester United in the Premier League, 4 March 1995.
Record FA Cup defeat:
7–0 against Chelsea in the third round, 9 January 2011.
Record European defeat: 
4–0 against F.C. Bruges, in the UEFA Cup, second round second leg, 5 November 1975.

Record consecutive results
Record consecutive wins: 9 (from 28 November 1981 to 23 January 1982).
Record consecutive defeats: 10 (from 4 September 1954 to 16 October 1954).
Record consecutive games without a defeat: 20 (from 20 December 1980 to 18 March 1981).
Record consecutive games without a win: 23 (from 28 August 1963 to 14 December 1963).

Attendances 
Highest attendance at a home match (Portman Road): 38,010 (against Leeds United), FA Cup sixth round, 8 March 1975.
Lowest attendance at Portman Road: 2,858 (against Northampton Town), Football League Division Three South Cup second round replay, 1 February 1939.

European statistics

Record by competition

Record by location 
Ipswich's record at Portman Road is peerless in European football. For 45 years, Ipswich held the record for the longest unbeaten run of games at home in European competition. The team's absence from such tournaments in recent years had seen the record overtaken by AZ Alkmaar, whose home undefeated run was finally broken by Everton in 2007.

European attendance records 
Highest home attendance: 33,663 against Barcelona, 23 October 1977.
Lowest home attendance: 13,440 against Skeid Oslo, 3 October 1979.
Highest away attendance: 100,000 against Barcelona, 21 March 1979.
Lowest away attendance: 2,971 against Avenir Beggen, 15 August 2002.

References
General

Specific

Records
Ipswich Town